The Civico Liceo Linguistico Alessandro Manzoni is a selective, independent day school in Milan, Italy, founded in 1861 and named after poet and author Alessandro Manzoni in 1886. Initially an all girls' school, it began accepting boys in 1978. It is now considered one of Italy's best schools of the liceo linguistico type.

Entry to the school is by examination, usually given in December of students' last year of middle school. In 2011, La Repubblica reported a record 1100 applicants for the 250 available places (with the possibility that the government might require a reduction to 220). In 2013, the Corriere della Sera reported that there were 6 applicants for each place at the school.

Activities
Liceo Linguistico Manzoni hosts and organizes Milan Model United Nations.

Other activities include being a center for HanBan Confucius's center, as well as hosting UNESCO days.

References

Alessandro Manzoni
Educational institutions established in 1861
Schools in Milan
1861 establishments in Italy